Glipodes is a genus of beetles in the family Mordellidae, containing the following species:

 Glipodes bordoni Franciscolo, 1990
 Glipodes dietrichi Franciscolo, 1962
 Glipodes sericans (Melsheimer, 1845)
 Glipodes tertia Ray, 1936

References

Mordellidae